Honcques Laus (born 10 October 2001) is a Hong Kong pro-independence activist, utilitarian, and writer. In 2017, he displayed a slogan showing 'Hong Kong independence' during a Ming Pao student event attended by the Chief Executive Carrie Lam. In 2020, he fled to the United Kingdom due to the controversial national security law passed in June, and was wanted by the Hong Kong Police Force later after.

Biography 
Honcques Laus was born at Tsan Yuk Hospital in Sai Ying Pun on 10 October 2001. He studied at Kwai Chung Methodist College and after that he started studying at Open University of Hong Kong.

From 2014 during the Umbrella Revolution, he started to realize that Hong Kong doesn't have democracy and freedom, making him start to be concerned about politics and social justice. In 2016, the localist groups gained significant traction during the New Territories East by-election, inspiring him to advocate independence.

On 16 November 2017, when he was in Form 5, during an awards ceremony held by Ming Pao, he had a chance to take a group photo with the chief executive Carrie Lam and he is in the back row. He held his phone with a "Hong Kong independence" slogan and no photographers realized that. After that, his school, Kwai Chung Methodist College, warned him on his behaviours but he thought it was his right to exercise freedom of demonstration and decided to protest outside the school on 24 November. However, while Hong Kong National Front and Studentlocalism were protesting on the day to support Laus, Laus was not allowed to leave the school for two hours due to "safety reasons".

In December 2017, he was arrested for bringing a toy gun which is unassembled and without a gun case at Lennon Wall near the Legislative Council Complex. He was later charged with possessing an imitation firearm. On 12 September 2018, he was sentenced an 18-month probation order. In June 2019, he appealed his charges and sentence, and represented by Martin Lee QC. On 4 July 2019, he won the appeal against conviction.

On 29 June 2019, he founded Hongkonger Utilitarian Party, a pro-independence group which advocates utilitarianism, emphasizing liberty, democracy and independence. He became the chairperson of the party.

In August 2019, he published his first book "" at the age of 17. Activists including Lam Wing-kee and Joshua Wong were invited to write the foreword.

In late June 2020, shortly before the Hong Kong national security law came into force, he fled to the United Kingdom and sought asylum. He said that he would not give up his political views. On 31 July, he was wanted, together with 5 other activists, by the HKPF. They were alleged to have "incitement to secession and collusion with foreign forces". In December 2020, Laus posted on Facebook that his Bank of China account was suspended although the account only had .

References

External links 

2001 births
Living people
Hong Kong writers
Hong Kong localists
Hong Kong activists
Child activists
Refugees in the United Kingdom
Fugitives wanted under the Hong Kong national security law
Utilitarians